A Mother's Instinct is a 1996 American mystery drama television film directed by Sam Pillsbury and written by Norman Morrill. It stars Lindsay Wagner, Debrah Farentino, and John Terry, and was filmed in Wilmington, North Carolina. It aired in the United States on CBS, on March 13, 1996.

Plot
A former divorcée learns that her new husband's past includes an abandoned wife. After he disappears with his two sons, the two wives team up to find him.

Cast
 Lindsay Wagner — Raeanne Gilbaine
 Debrah Farentino — Holly Mitchell
 John Terry — Carl Gibbons/Gilbaine
 Lynne Thigpen — 'Mike' Wheelwright (as Lynn Thigpen)
 Alana Austin — Amanda
 Lee Norris — Jeremy/Joey
 Andres Nichols — Ronald/Robby (as Andy Nichols)
 Barbara Babcock — Mrs. Mitchell
 Laura Robbins — Sheila
 Alex Van — Bobby Mitchell
 Mert Hatfield — Gerard Fudge
 Pete Burris — Cop
 Chris Daughtry — Richard Mitchell
 Bob Hannah — Headmaster
 Richard K. Olsen — Justice of the Peace
 George Nannarello — Hal Bingham

External links

1996 films
1996 drama films
1990s English-language films
1990s mystery drama films
American drama television films
American mystery drama films
CBS network films
Films directed by Sam Pillsbury
Films shot in North Carolina
1990s American films